Basmisanil (developmental codes RG-1662 and RO5186582) is a highly selective inverse agonist/negative allosteric modulator of α5 subunit-containing GABAA receptors which is under development by Roche for the treatment of cognitive impairment associated with Down syndrome. As of June 2016, it is no longer studied. It is studied with schizophrenia patients.

See also
 List of investigational antipsychotics
 GABAA receptor negative allosteric modulator
 GABAA receptor § Ligands

References

External links
 Basmisanil - AdisInsight

Fluoroarenes
GABAA receptor negative allosteric modulators
Nicotinamides
Nootropics
Isoxazoles